Alexa Guarachi and Erin Routliffe were the defending champions but Guarachi chose to compete at Rome instead.

Routliffe played alongside Aldila Sutjiadi and successfully defended her title after defeating Eri Hozumi and Miyu Kato 6–3, 4–6, [10–6] in the final.

Seeds

Draw

Draw

References
Main Draw

FineMark Women's Pro Tennis Championship - Doubles